Bourghelles is a commune in the Nord department in northern France.

Etymology
First recorded in 1197 as Borghela (small fortress); ultimately from Proto-Germanic *burgs (hill fort, fortress) and diminutive suffix.

Population

Heraldry

See also
 Communes of the Nord department

References

Communes of Nord (French department)
French Flanders